The Christian Theological Academy in Warsaw (ChAT) is a non-profit public university in Warsaw. It was established in 1954.

References

External links
Official Website

Universities in Poland
1954 establishments in Poland
Seminaries and theological colleges in Poland
Universities established in the 1950s